Dalton's law (also called Dalton's law of partial pressures) states that in a mixture of non-reacting gases, the total  pressure exerted is equal to the sum of the partial pressures of the individual gases. This empirical law was observed by John Dalton in 1801 and published in 1802. Dalton's law is related to the ideal gas laws.

Formula
Mathematically, the pressure of a mixture of non-reactive gases can be defined as the summation:

where p1, p2, ..., pn represent the partial pressures of each component.

where xi is the mole fraction of the ith component in the total mixture of n components .

Volume-based concentration
The relationship below provides a way to determine the volume-based concentration of any individual gaseous component

where ci is the concentration of component i.

Dalton's law is not strictly followed by real gases, with the deviation increasing with pressure. Under such conditions the volume occupied by the molecules becomes significant compared to the free space between them. In particular, the short average distances between molecules increases intermolecular forces between gas molecules enough to substantially change the pressure exerted by them, an effect not included in the ideal gas model.

See also

References

Gas laws
Physical chemistry
Engineering thermodynamics

de:Partialdruck#Dalton-Gesetz
et:Daltoni seadus